The Exposition internationale du bicentenaire de Port-au-Prince was a world's fair held in Port-au-Prince, Haiti in 1949 to mark the 200th anniversary of the city's founding.

Creation
President Dumarsais Estimé argued in 1948 for an exposition to demonstrate Haitian culture to other countries and encourage tourism and committed $1 million (then almost three-quarters of Haiti's annual budget) to the project.

The fair opened on ground at the Gonave Bay which had been cleared of houses and landscaped with gardens, parks and tall coconut and palm trees

Opening
There were two opening ceremonies: the first on December 8, 1949 and the second on February 12, 1950.

During the first ceremony, a telegram from US president Harry S. Truman to Haitian president Dumarsais Estimé was read out, a parade of US soldiers and marines and a US Air Force squadron flew overhead, and the national exhibits and amusement area opened.

During the second ceremony, the international as well as the official pavilions were opened. Displays were on show from Argentina, Cuba, France, Guatemala, Italy, Mexico and Venezuela, with Vatican City providing a chapel.

Art and music
An art competition was held, with Gesner Abelard winning a bronze prize, and Jacques-Enguerrand Gourgue a gold.

Marian Anderson, 
Alberto Beltran, 
Frantz Casseus, 
Celia Cruz, 
Miles Davis, 
Issa El Saeih, 
Dizzy Gillespie,
Ernst Lamy, 
Ti Ro Ro, 
La Scala singers, 
members of the Grand National Opera New York,  
Daniel Santos, 
Don Shirley
and Bebo Valdes 
all performed during the exposition.

Participants 
Among the countries invited and participating in this Universal Exhibition of 1949:
Europe
France, which supported this project with its  Minister of Foreign Affairs Robert Schumann,  Belgium, Spain, Italy, Saint-Marin and Vatican City, the latter for which a chapel was built.
Asia
Lebanon, Syria and Palestine 
America
Canada, United States, Venezuela, Mexico, Argentina, Guatemala, Chile, Puerto Rico, Cuba and Jamaica
International organisations
United Nations and Organization of American States.

Legacy
Following the close of the exposition many of the pavilions were used for Haitian Governmental Buildings.  The Pavilion of Haiti was converted into the Legislative Assembly Building.  The Post Pavilion became a post office.  The Guatemala Pavilion became the home of the Haiti Red Cross, and the Vatican Pavilion became a church.  The devastating 2010 Haiti earthquake laid waste to many buildings in Haiti including most of these exposition buildings including the Legislative Building, Red Cross, and Post Office.

References

External links
Official website of the BIE
 The International Exposition of Port-au-Prince 1949-50, by Hadassah St. Hubert. Retrieved 10 March 2013
 

1949 festivals
1949 in Haiti
20th century in Port-au-Prince
Events in Port-au-Prince
Haiti